The Blessed and the Damned is the title of a program of two one-act plays staged by Orson Welles in 1950, which he also wrote and starred in. Le Monde called the show a masterpiece of scenic art. The performance included filmed elements.

Eartha Kitt and Hilton Edwards were also part of the show.

A photo of Welles and others discussing work on the show exists.

The two plays were Time Runs and The Unthinking Lobster. Indiana University's Lilly Library has a playbill for the shows. The University of Michigan's archives acquired a script for The Unthinking Lobster.

See also
The Miracle of St. Anne, a short film that was part of the performance

References

Stage productions of plays